Lhasa Gonggar Airport is the airport serving Lhasa, the capital city of the Tibet Autonomous Region, People's Republic of China.

The airport was first built in 1965, a second runway was built in 1994, the second terminal was built in 2004, and the brand new, third terminal was operational in 2021.

History
Building an airport in Tibet, which is termed in flying parlance as going over a "hump" in the Tibetan Plateau, has gone through a process of trial and error through many hazardous air routes and several fatal accidents during World War II.

Damxung Airport

Due to remoteness this airport was serviced by a  gravel runway but needed constant maintenance due to high winds blowing away the stones.

Flights were sparse with a limited daily window in the morning, departure before afternoon to avoid high winds and eventually limited to flights to one per month or one month and a half. There was no terminal building (added later with two aprons on the southwest end) and staff lived in a small building on site.

An Ilyushin Il-12 and a Convair CV-240-401 were the first aircraft that landed at Damxung airport from the north and south. They thus broke the jinx of the "forbidden air zone", and this was acclaimed a feat. It took almost nine more years before the first Beijing-Chengdu-Lhasa air route became operational in 1965.

Gonggar Airport
In 1965 the Gonggar Airport was constructed to provide a more reliable location. Damxung Airport was decommissioned later (site partially converted into a race course with footprint of runway visible from satellite views) and the Lhasa Aviation Office was moved from Damxung to Gonggar Airport.

This established the Gonngar Airport as the second airport in Tibet. Over the years, with more expansion of the facilities, Gonggar became the domestic hub in the Tibetan Plateau connecting many other airports in Tibet.

In 2021, Terminal 3 was put into service. It occupies a floor area of 88,000m² and has 21 extra gates for boarding and deplaning, enabling the airport to serve 9 million passengers per year by 2025. The new terminal has a lotus-shaped roof and rich Tibetan style architecture, paying homage to Tibetan culture and ethnic identity.

Geographic environment

Gonggar Airport is in Gyazuling township of the Gonggar County. It is built in the county where Yarlung Tsangpo River (the Brahmaputra River) is very wide on the right bank (southern bank) of the river providing facilities for the runways. It is for this reason that the airport was constructed at this location, though away from Lhasa where space was a limitation. The airport lies to the west of Rawa-me, which is the capital of the county, at the entry of the Namrab Valley,  from Tsetang.
Access to the airport from Lhasa has been further facilitated by constructing a road tunnel, which has reduced the distance and time taken to reach the airport from Lhasa by 40 minutes; time of travel from Lhasa is now about 40–60 minutes by shuttle bus services.
The tunnel and Lhasa Airport Expressway opened in July 2011.

Airport description
There are four aero bridges (one two-way bridge and three single-way bridges) to facilitate passengers to board and disembark from the aircraft. The airport began operation in 1965 with flights to Beijing and Chengdu commencing that March. Recent additions included the expansion of the existing terminal in 2004 and as a result the airport has the facility to check in 1,300 passengers per hour during peak hours.

The airport has parking facilities for five Airbus A340 or seven Boeing 757 aircraft.

The airport is connected to the rest of China, which includes cities such as Beijing, Chengdu, Shanghai, Guangzhou, Hong Kong, Chongqing, Xi'an, Xining, Kunming, Diqing and Chamdo Region. There is an international route connecting Kathmandu, Nepal and Lhasa.

Flight handling
All flights to and from the Lhasa Gonggar Airport are handled by seven Chinese-based airlines: Air China, China Eastern, China Southern, Shenzhen, Hainan, Sichuan, and Tibet Airlines. During tourist season (roughly April to October), there can be as many as 40 domestic flights every week to and from Gonggar, carrying on average as many as 700,000 passengers every year. There is only one international route at present: a once or twice weekly (depending on the season) flight to and from Kathmandu. It is typically not possible to purchase air tickets directly from these carriers given the requirement of obtaining the necessary governmental travel permit, which is not the same as the visa to gain entry into the rest of mainland China. It was expected that this figure would reach 110,000 by the year 2010.

Incidentally, Nagqu Dagring Airport is expected to become the world's highest altitude airport by 2014 at 4,436 meters above sea level.

Given the frequency of strong air currents picking up in the afternoon, most flights into the airport are scheduled in the morning.

A night landing facility was created by fixing navigational lighting facilities on the runway at a cost of 99 million yuan (US$13.2 million) only in 2007. This adds to the handling capacity of the airport by about 40%. The night landing facility was commissioned on 14 November 2007 with the landing of an Airbus A319 aircraft of Air China carrying 90 passengers. This facility was made operational initially once a week on Wednesdays from Chengdu Shuangliu International Airport in Sichuan Province. With this facility the airport planned to handle 1.1 million passengers every year by 2010, as against 1.005 million in 2007.

The airport was able to accommodate an Airbus A330 overnight for the first time on April 11, 2017, a problem due to the airport's high altitude.

Infrastructure
A new highway between Lhasa and the Gonggar Airport has been built by the Transportation Department of Tibet at a cost of RMB 1.5 billion yuan. It is a four-lane road of  length. This road is part of the National Highway 318; it starts from the Lhasa railway station, passes through the Caina Township in Qushui County, terminates between the north entrance of the Gala Mountain Tunnel and the south bridge head of Lhasa River Bridge, and en route goes over the first overpass of Lhasa at Liuwu Overpass.

Airlines and destinations

See also
List of highest airports

References

Airports in the Tibet Autonomous Region
Transport in Lhasa
Gonggar County